Oreonana clementis, the pygmy mountainparsley, is a perennial plant in the carrot family (Apiaceae) that grows in the United States Sierra Nevada mountain range.

Habitat and range

Description

Balls of whitish flower clusters on short stems occur from May to August.

References

Apioideae
Flora of the Sierra Nevada (United States)